The 2015 Viennese state election was held on 11 October 2015 to elect the members of the Gemeinderat and Landtag of Vienna.

The election saw losses for the centre-left Social Democratic Party of Austria (SPÖ) and conservative Austrian People's Party (ÖVP), the traditional major parties of Austrian politics, and gains for the right-wing populist Freedom Party of Austria (FPÖ) and liberal NEOS – The New Austria (NEOS). The SPÖ recorded its worst result since 1996, while the ÖVP suffered its worst ever result in an Austrian election, placing fourth with just 9.2% of votes.

Background
The Viennese constitution mandates that cabinet positions in the city government (city councillors) be allocated between parties proportionally in accordance with the share of votes won by each; this is known as Proporz. The number of city councillors is voted upon by the Landtag after each election, and may legally vary between nine and fifteen. City councillors are divided into two groups – "senior" councillors, who hold a cabinet portfolio, and "non-executive" councillors who do not. Non-executive councillors may vote in cabinet meetings, but do not otherwise hold any government responsibility. In practice, parties seek to form a coalition which holds a majority in both the Landtag and city government. City councillors bound to the coalition become senior councillors, while the opposition are relegated to non-executive status.

In the 2010 state election, the SPÖ lost its majority. The SPÖ won eight councillors, the FPÖ three, the ÖVP one, and the Greens one. The SPÖ formed a coalition with the Greens.

Electoral system
The 100 seats of the Gemeinderat and Landtag of Vienna are elected via open list proportional representation in a two-step process. The seats are distributed between eighteen multi-member constituencies. For parties to receive any representation in the Landtag, they must either win at least one seat in a constituency directly, or clear a 5 percent state-wide electoral threshold. Seats are distributed in constituencies according to the Droop quota, with any remaining seats allocated using the D'Hondt method applied to surplus votes at the state level, to ensure overall semiproportionality between a party's vote share and its share of seats.

Contesting parties
The table below lists parties represented in the previous Landtag.

In addition to the parties already represented in the Landtag, eight parties collected enough signatures to be placed on the ballot.

 NEOS – The New Austria (NEOS)
 Vienna Differently (ANDAS)
 Together for Vienna (GfW)
 We want Freedom of Choice - List Pollischansky (WWW)
 We for Floridsdorf (WIFF)  – on the ballot only in Floridsdorf
 Men's Party (M) – on the ballot only in Donaustadt
 Socialist Left Party (SLP) – on the ballot only in Brigittenau
 Free Democrats (FREIE) – on the ballot only in Centre

Results

Results by constituency

Aftermath
In light of the ÖVP's historically poor result, state chairman Manfred Juraczka announced his resignation on election night. He was succeeded by general-secretary Gernot Blümel.

Ahead of the election, Greens top candidate and deputy mayor Maria Vassilakou stated she would resign if the Greens did not improve on their 2010 result. However, after suffering a loss of 0.8% in the election, Vassilakou reneged on the pledge, instead seeking to renew the coalition with the SPÖ and secure a second term as deputy mayor. She was subject to criticism from the public and her own party, with fellow Greens deputy Johannes Voggenhuber stating her broken promise demonstrated a "loss of reality" within the party leadership. The day after the election, Vassilakou offered her resignation to the Greens state congress, but it was rejected. She was harshly criticised by SPÖ deputy Peko Baxant, who said "I really don't know if you can continue to work with such people."

Post-election, Häupl announced he would seek a coalition with the Greens. He also stated that the SPÖ would be open to abolishing the non-executive councillors, but noted they had "a long way to go" due to the two-thirds Landtag majority required to amend the state constitution. Since the FPÖ won over a third of seats, it was entitled to take one of the two deputy mayor positions; this was filled by Johann Gudenus. He remained a non-executive councillor. The SPÖ and Greens finalised a 150-page coalition agreement on 13 November, which was subsequently approved by both parties. The government was sworn in on 24 November.

References

2015 elections in Austria
State elections in Austria
October 2015 events in Europe
Politics of Vienna